Admiral Sir George Hamilton D'Oyly Lyon, KCB (3 October 1883 – 19 August 1947) was a distinguished Royal Navy officer as well as an English sportsman who played first-class cricket and represented the England national rugby union team.

Naval career
Educated at Bruton School and at the Royal Naval College, Dartmouth, Lyon joined the Navy on 15 June 1899, and saw active service at the Battle of Jutland, aboard HMS Monarch.

He was appointed Head of the British Naval Mission to Greece in 1929 and Commodore Commanding, Home Fleet Destroyers in 1932. He then became Rear Admiral commanding the 3rd Cruiser Squadron in 1935 and Commander-in-Chief, Africa in 1938 (the Africa Station became the South Atlantic Station in 1939).

He served in World War II as Commander-in-Chief, The Nore from 1941 and retired in 1943.

Sporting career
Lyon, in four first-class cricket matches, made 185 runs at 26.42 and took 7 wickets at 20.00. A right-arm medium pace bowler and right-handed batsman, he played twice for Hampshire in the 1907 County Championship. On debut, his only significant contribution was dismissing Worcestershire opener Harry Foster while in the other match for Hampshire, he claimed the wicket of Ernest Killick, of Sussex, after Lyon made his then highest score of 29.

Capped twice for England at rugby union, Lyon was a full-back and made his Test debut at Inverleith, in a loss to Scotland during the 1908 Home Nations Championship. When he appeared in his second and final Test the following year, it was as captain and against Australia at Blackheath. England once again lost the fixture but were awarding no less than nine players their first Test caps.

His return to first-class cricket in 1911 was much more successful, with an appearance for an Army and Navy cricket team against the Oxford and Cambridge Universities team at Portsmouth. Despite batting down the order at nine, Lyon was the top scorer for the Army and Navy in their first innings, with 90. He then managed career best figures of 4/51 and one of those, Ronald Lagden, was also an English rugby union international. Lyon's final first-class match came eleven years later when he lined up for the Royal Navy against the Army at Lord's. He contributed scores of 22 and 32 but couldn't stop the Army winning by 9 wickets.

Family
His son, Patrick Maxwell Lyon, was a second lieutenant in the Middlesex Regiment. He was killed in the Belgian campaign of May 1940.

References

External links

Cricinfo: George Lyon
Scrum: George Lyon

|-

|-

1883 births
1947 deaths
English rugby union players
England international rugby union players
English cricketers
Hampshire cricketers
Royal Navy cricketers
Royal Navy admirals of World War II
Royal Navy officers of World War I
Knights Commander of the Order of the Bath
Grand Crosses of the Order of Aviz
Army and Navy cricketers
United Services players
Military personnel of British India
Rugby union fullbacks